Bio Zombie is a 1998 Hong Kong zombie comedy film, starring Jordan Chan. It spoofs George A. Romero's Dawn of the Dead and shows many similarities to Peter Jackson's Braindead.

Plot 
Woody Invincible and Crazy Bee are two young men selling bootlegged VCDs at a small stall in the New Trend Plaza Mall, and spend time gambling and thieving from other shops. They meet Rolls, an employee at the beauty parlor, then have a run-in with Mr. Kui, the cellphone store owner. Rolls frequents a sushi bar in the mall, and flirts with the waiter Loi, who is smitten with her.

Elsewhere, black market dealers sell to three government agents a bioweapon which turns people into zombies. They brought a zombie to demonstrate the substance's effect, but it breaks out and kills two agents. On the way back after picking up their boss's fixed car, Woody hits the surviving agent, who is carrying a sample of a bioweapon contained in a soft drink bottle. Thinking he needs a drink, Woody pours the sample into his mouth. The two bring him back to the mall, and Woody damages the car again. The reanimated agent slips out of the car, dropping his cellphone.

Woody sells the cellphone to Kui, but still does not have enough money to fix the car. Woody and Bee then steal Rolls' money and ring. A suspicious Rolls asks Woody to find the robbers in return for a free meal. She intends to get him drunk, so he would admit to the robbery. At the sushi bar, they get drunk, and Woody and Rolls head to the bathroom to have sex. Loi follows them, but is attacked by the zombified agent, and interrupts Woody and Rolls in an attempt to warn them about the zombie.

Loi becomes a zombie himself and takes Rolls captive. The agent retrieves his cellphone from Kui's shop. Kui accuses Woody and Bee of theft, and Ox, a security guard, calls the police. Two policemen, badge numbers #3001 and #9466, question the Kui's, Woody and Bee. Woody and Bee's behaviors makes the officers suspicious, and #9466 eventually handcuffs them in the security guard's office. While #3001 searches the mall for witnesses to the theft, he is killed by Loi.

The agent bursts into the security office, kills Ox and attacks #9466. The policeman kills the zombie, but dies from his injuries. Bee gets the handcuff key from #9466, and frees himself and Woody. The two heads to the mall entrance, and sees Jelly, Rolls' co-worker, who just got back after a walk. The reanimated Ox remotely closes the mall's shutter, trapping everyone inside. The three then meets the Kui's, and the group hides in the beauty parlor.

Woody heads out alone to call the police. He rescues Rolls while Loi is distracted fighting off other zombies who want to attack her, and tey return to the beauty parlor. The group decide to board an elevator and escape, but it cannot move due to the weight limit. As a zombie approaches, Kui pushes Jelly out. The rest of the group leaves Kui behind to rescue Jelly, but find her dead. On the way to the security office, both Mrs. and Mr. Kui are killed by zombies. Bee, distracted by Mrs. Kui's death, is bitten.

At the security office, Woody, Rolls and Bee cannot find the security key to open the entrance door. After saying his last words, Bee is killed by Ox. Enraged, Woody beheads Ox, then cuts off Bee's head before he reanimates. Woody and Rolls head down the parking garage, now crawling with zombies. Fighting their way through the shambling undead, they reach Woody's boss's car. Loi appears, lifts up the garage shutter, then pushes the car out so that the two can escape.

At a gas station, Woody is unable to find a working phone. He sees an emergency broadcast which warns people against drinking soft drinks, as they may contain a biochemical substance. Looking outside, Woody sees Rolls drinking from the bottle which he earlier took from the agent. He re-enters the car, and Rolls asks him if he was able to contact any authorities. Woody looks at her and drinks the remainder of the soft drink.

Cast
 Jordan Chan as Woody Invincible
 Sam Lee as Crazy Bee
 Angela Tong as Rolls
 Wayne Lai as Kui
 Emotion Cheung as  Loi
 Tak Chi Tam as Policeman #3001
 Chi Chuen Chan as Policeman #9466 
 Yeung Wing Cheung as Chinki Zombie
 Frankie Chan as Ox
 Ronny Ching as Chan Kam-Shing
 Matt Chow as Shing's Assistant
 Ken Lok

Voice cast (English version):
 Sparky Thornton as Woody Invincible
 David Umansky as Crazy Bee
 Matt K. Miller as  Kui
 Bob Bobson as VCD Nerd
 Francis Cherry as Man A
 Richard Epcar as Ox
 Tara Jayne as Jelly
 Steve Kramer as Yung/Zombies
 Wendee Lee as Rolls
 Dave Mallow as Loi
 Dorothy Melendrez as Mrs. Kui / TV announcer / Cindy
 Anthony Mozdy as Boss / Sushi Chef / Movie Actor 1 / Zombies

Box office
The film grossed HK$6,207,050 at the Hong Kong box office during its theatrical run from 11 June to 30 June 1998 in Hong Kong.

Release
The film was also released as Hong Kong Zombie.

References

External links

 
 Review at Kung Fu Cult Cinema

1998 films
1990s comedy horror films
1998 horror films
1990s Cantonese-language films
Hong Kong comedy horror films
Films directed by Wilson Yip
Zombie comedy films
1998 comedy films
Hong Kong zombie films
1990s Hong Kong films